Robert K. Wright Jr. (born 1946) is an American military historian and author.
After growing up in Connecticut, he graduated in 1968 with a degree in history from the College of the Holy Cross in Worcester, Massachusetts. He entered the Army, serving as a Teletype operator in Berlin, and then with the 18th Military History Detachment. During the second assignment he recorded the operations of the 25th Infantry Division in Vietnam during 1969 and 1970.

After his discharge in 1970, Sergeant Wright attended graduate school on the GI Bill, ultimately earning his Ph.D. in history from the College of William and Mary in 1980. He spent most of his career at the United States Army Center of Military History in Washington, D.C. In 1982 he was commissioned in the Virginia Army National Guard where he commanded the 116th Military History Detachment in Manassas, Virginia as a captain and then as a major.  From 1989 to 1991 he served at Fort Bragg, North Carolina, as the XVIII Airborne Corps command historian.  In that capacity he deployed with the corps to Panama (Operation JUST CAUSE) and the first Persian Gulf war (Operation DESERT SHIELD-DESERT STORM).  As an Army Reservist he also deployed to Somalia (Operation RESTORE HOPE) as part of the first-ever joint history team composed of historians from the Army, Navy, Air Force and Marine Corps.  He retired from government service in 2002 as the chief of the Center of Military History's library and archives.

Wright's 1983 book, The Continental Army, has become the standard reference that describes the army of the Revolutionary War: its history, structure, organization and units.

Books

The Continental Army; 1983, United States Army Center of Military History Washington, D.C.; .  Available online.
Soldier-Statesmen of the Constitution; 1987, United States Army Center of Military History, Washington, D.C.; . Available online.
Military Police; 1991, United States Army Center of Military History, Washington, D.C.; . Available online.
Story of the N.C.O., 1986 United States Army Center of Military History, Washington, D.C.
The Tradition Continues:  The Virginia Army National Guard, 1985.
Airborne Forces at War: From Parachute Test Platoon to the 21st Century. Association of the U.S. Army and Naval Institute Press, Annapolis, Maryland, 2007.

References

1946 births
College of William & Mary alumni
Living people
21st-century American historians
21st-century American male writers
United States Army historians
American male non-fiction writers